Nina Prešiček (born 3 December 1976) is a Slovenian pianist.

Born in Kranj, in 2000 Prešiček completed her piano study at the State University of Music and Performing Arts Stuttgart. She furthered her studies in France (Thérèse Dussaut), Austria (Jörg Demus), Germany (Arbo Valdma) and USA (John Perry). She debuted in 1995 with the performance in Stuttgart of Chopin's 2nd piano concerto.

Her brother is saxophonist Dejan Prešiček.

External links 
 John Cage Sonatas and Interludes for prepared piano played by Nina Presicek part 1. (YouTube)

1976 births
Musicians from Kranj
Slovenian classical pianists
Women classical pianists
Living people
21st-century classical pianists
21st-century women pianists